The statue of Helmuth von Moltke the Elder by Joseph Uphues is located near the Berlin Victory Column in the Tiergarten, Berlin.

References

External links

 

Statues in Berlin
Outdoor sculptures in Berlin
Sculptures of men in Germany
Statues in Germany
Tiergarten (park)